René Billères (29 August 1910 in Ger, Hautes-Pyrénées – 2 October 2004 in Lourdes, Hautes-Pyrénées) was a French politician.

Billères served as a Radical deputy for the Hautes-Pyrénées from 1946 till 1973 and Senator for the same department from 1973 till 1983. He served as Minister of National Education in numerous Fourth Republic governments (Guy Mollet, Maurice Bourgès-Maunoury and Félix Gaillard). As Minister of National Education, he extended the years of compulsory schooling and played an instrumental role in increasing the ministry's budget.

As President of the Radical Party from 1965 to 1969, he played an important role in the Federation of the Democratic and Socialist Left.

References

1910 births
2004 deaths
People from Hautes-Pyrénées
Politicians from Occitania (administrative region)
Radical Party (France) politicians
Radical Party of the Left politicians
French Ministers of National Education
Members of the Constituent Assembly of France (1946)
Deputies of the 1st National Assembly of the French Fourth Republic
Deputies of the 2nd National Assembly of the French Fourth Republic
Deputies of the 3rd National Assembly of the French Fourth Republic
Deputies of the 1st National Assembly of the French Fifth Republic
Deputies of the 2nd National Assembly of the French Fifth Republic
Deputies of the 3rd National Assembly of the French Fifth Republic
Deputies of the 4th National Assembly of the French Fifth Republic
French Senators of the Fifth Republic
Senators of Hautes-Pyrénées
French people of the Algerian War